Hades Publications is a publishing company owned by Brian Hades that focuses on science fiction and fantasy literature. The company publishes under four different imprints and is currently the largest dedicated Canadian publisher of science fiction and fantasy.

History
Brian Hades spent a great deal of time in the performing arts prior to starting Trickster Books in 1999, a line of Books, Manuals, Manuscripts and Posters on Magic, Illusion, Conjuring and Variety Arts.

A year later he started Hades Publications and his second imprint, Edge Science Fiction and Fantasy Publishing. The vision was "to encourage, produce and promote thought-provoking and well written science fiction and fantasy literature."

In 2007, Hades Publications entered into a partnership with Red Deer-based Dragoon Moon Press. This made Hades Publications the largest dedicated Canadian publisher of Science Fiction and Fantasy. This imprint remains independent but utilizes Hades Publications distribution channels.(Announced on August 18, 2007)

In 2009, Hades Publications entered into the POD and E-book market with a new imprint Absolute XPress. It started as an all encompassing imprint publishing many different genres, but nearing the 1 year anniversary the press changed focus returning to Science Fiction, Fantasy and Horror.  This imprint has been closed to submissions for over a year now (as of August 2011).

The First Book

Calgary author Marie Jakober's The Black Chalice was the first book to be published by Edge Science Fiction and Fantasy Publishing. It has won three major awards  and garnered high praise from reviewers and readers alike.

Notable authors and works
Edge Science Fiction and Fantasy

 Marie Jakober's The Black Chalice, published in 2000.
 The Tesseracts Anthology, now publishing its 14th in the series. It contains such authors as Spider Robinson, William Gibson, Margaret Atwood and Cory Doctorow and has won the Prix Aurora Award several times.
 Throne Price by Lynda Williams was a finalist for the Foreword Magazine Book of the Year Award.

Absolute XPress

 Women of the Apocalypse, a novella collection, won two Prix Aurora Awards for Best Other Work in English, and the Novella "Pawns Dreaming of Roses" by Eileen Bell won for Best Short Form in English.

Imprints
Hades Publications has four book imprints, all of which are based in Canada. 
 Absolute Xpress
 Edge Science Fiction and Fantasy Publishing (includes the Award Winning Tesseracts Anthology and defunct imprint)
 Dragon Moon Press
 Trickster Books

See also
Canadian Science Fiction

References

External links
 Edge Science Fiction and Fantasy Publishing
 Absolute Xpress
 Dragon Moon Press
 Trickster Books

Book publishing companies of Canada
Publishing companies established in 2000
Small press publishing companies